The Munger Place Historic District is a neighborhood and historic district in Old East Dallas, Texas (USA), generally lying between North Fitzhugh Avenue on the southwest, Gaston Avenue on the northwest, Henderson Avenue on the northeast, and Columbia Avenue on the southeast.  Detailed boundaries are defined in the Munger Place Ordinance. It is a Dallas Landmark District and listed on the National Register of Historic Places.

History 

To attract the "right" social element, Munger Place was carefully planned. Just minutes from downtown Dallas by carriage, Munger Place became the very first deed-restricted neighborhood in Texas. Homes had to be a full two stories, cost at least US$2,000 and no house could face a side street. The infrastructure featured such amenities as sidewalks, paved streets, shade trees, sewers, gas mains, and electric street lights. Many of the Dallas' leading businessmen and social elite soon called magnificent Munger Place home.

The Great Depression led many of the community's mansions to be converted into multi-family housing.  The neighborhood lost its elite cachet, and by the 1960s many of the nicer houses in the area had been torn down or condemned.  Starting in the 1970s, however, Munger Place began to be rediscovered, as enterprising individuals recognized the historic architecture (particularly Prairie Style) and large spaces behind the neighborhood's dilapidated veneer.

Heritage designations 

Only a portion of Munger Place is included in the Munger Place Historic District. Munger Place can be described as having northern, western, and southern portions. The northern and western portion of Munger Place is in the Swiss Avenue Historic District. The southern portion generally is in the Munger Place Historic District. Separating the two historic districts is Gaston Avenue, and the lots on either side of Gaston Avenue are excluded from either historic district.

In 1978, the National Park Service added Munger Place Historic District to the National Register of Historic Places. In 1980, the City of Dallas recognized the historic district as a Landmark District. The boundaries of the national and city districts are nearly the same.

Comprising over 250 households it is the largest collection of Prairie-Style homes in America. With most of the homes now completely renovated, Munger Place has once again become a desirable neighborhood for families of all types looking for charming, historic homes near downtown Dallas. Each year the neighborhood holds a home tour and art festival that attracts fans of historic architecture and independent artists.

Education 
The neighborhood is served by the Dallas Independent School District (DISD).

Residents in the neighborhood northeast of N Fitzhugh Avenue are zoned to William Lipscomb Elementary School (grades PK-5) in Junius Heights, J.L. Long Middle School, and Woodrow Wilson High School. Residents in the neighborhood southwest of N Fitzhugh Avenue (along a short section of Tremont Street) are zoned to Ignacio Zaragoza Elementary School, Alex W. Spence Middle School, and North Dallas High School.

Residents' children also attend various magnet schools in the district, as well as a variety of private schools in and around the area including Holy Trinity Catholic School, St. Thomas Aquinas Catholic School, Lakehill Preparatory School, St. John's Episcopal School and First Baptist Academy.

Photo gallery

See also

National Register of Historic Places listings in Dallas County, Texas
List of Dallas Landmarks

References

External links

Historic districts on the National Register of Historic Places in Texas
Houses on the National Register of Historic Places in Texas
National Register of Historic Places in Dallas
Dallas Landmarks
Neighborhoods in Old East Dallas
Houses in Dallas County, Texas